Gypsy Abbott (January 31, 1896 – July 25, 1952) was an American silent film actress.

Career
Before entering films, Gypsy Abbott performed for a number of years on stage and in vaudeville. She began with E. H. Sothern's repertoire company and later played Flora Belle Fry in a road production of George M. Cohan's Little Johnny Jones.

She married director Henry King in 1915 and was sometimes credited as Gypsie Abbott.

Abbott died on July 25, 1952, aged 55. She is buried in the Grotto Section at Holy Cross Cemetery in Culver City, California.

Filmography 

 The Path of Sorrow (1913)
 Called Back (1914)
 The Key to Yesterday (1914)
 The Man Who Could Not Lose (1914)
 St. Elmo (1914)
 Who Pays? (1915)
 Beulah (1915)
 For the Commonwealth (1915)
 Letters Entangled (1915)
 The Fruit of Folly (1915)
 Vengeance Is Mine! (1916)
 For Ten Thousand Bucks (1916)
 Bungling Bill's Dress Suit (1916)
 Some Liars (1916)
 Her Luckless Scheme (1916)
 Going to the Dogs (1916)
 Rolling to Ruin (1916)
 Paste and Politics (1916)
 A Touch of High Life (1916)
 Her Painted Pedigree (1916)
 Bungling Bill's Bow-Wow (1916)
 Lost, Strayed or Stolen (1916)
 With or Without (1916)
 The Wicked City (1916)
 Shot in the Fracas (1916)
 Jealous Jolts (1916)
 A Lislebank(1917)
 A Circus Cyclone (1917)
 The Musical Marvel (1917)
 The Butcher's Nightmare (1917)
 A Studio Stampede (1917)
 His Bogus Boast (1917)
 When Ben Bolted (1917)
 Lorelei of the Sea (1917)

Sources

External links 

1896 births
1952 deaths
American silent film actresses
Actresses from Atlanta
Burials at Holy Cross Cemetery, Culver City
Vaudeville performers
American stage actresses
20th-century American actresses
Deaths from lung cancer in California